Alfred Berglund (1862 – 1945) was a Norwegian admiral.

He was born in Christiania. He was the Chief of the Admiral Staff from 1910, reached the rank of rear admiral in 1919, and served as the Commanding Admiral of Norway from 1919 to 1930.

References

1862 births
1945 deaths
Royal Norwegian Navy admirals